Velarivirus is a genus of viruses, in the family Closteroviridae. Plants serve as natural hosts. There are eight species in this genus. Diseases associated with this genus include: GLRaV-7: symptomless in white-berried grapevine cultivar from Albania. However, it induces leafroll symptoms onto grafted cv. cabernet.

Taxonomy
The following species are assigned to the genus:
 Areca palm velarivirus 1
 Cordyline virus 1
 Cordyline virus 2
 Cordyline virus 3
 Cordyline virus 4
 Grapevine leafroll-associated virus 7
 Little cherry virus 1
 Malus domestica virus A

Structure
Viruses in the genus Velarivirus are non-enveloped, with filamentous geometries. These viruses are about 1500-1700 nm long. Genomes are linear, around 16-17kb in length. The genome codes for 10 proteins.

Life cycle
Viral replication is cytoplasmic. Entry into the host cell is achieved by penetration into the host cell. Replication follows the positive stranded RNA virus replication model. Positive stranded RNA virus transcription is the method of transcription. The virus exits the host cell by tubule-guided viral movement.
Plants serve as the natural host. Transmission routes are mechanical.

References

External links
 ICTV Report: Closteroviridae
 Viralzone: Velarivirus

Closteroviridae
Virus genera